
Gmina Kowala is a rural gmina (administrative district) in Radom County, Masovian Voivodeship, in east-central Poland.

Villages
Gmina Kowala contains the villages and settlements of Augustów, Bardzice, Dąbrówka Zabłotnia, Grabina, Huta Mazowszańska, Kończyce-Kolonia, Kosów,
Kotarwice, Kowala, Ludwinów, Maliszów, Mazowszany, Młodocin Mniejszy, Parznice, Romanów, Rożki, Ruda Mała and Trablice.

Neighbouring gminas
Gmina Kowala is bordered by the city of Radom and by the gminas of Orońsko, Skaryszew, Wierzbica and Wolanów.

References
Polish official population figures 2006

Kowala
Radom County